Sir Pascal Claude Roland Soriot (born 23 May 1959) is a French-born Australian businessman and chief executive officer (CEO) of the British-Swedish multinational pharmaceutical and biotechnology company AstraZeneca.

Early life
Pascal Soriot was born in France on 23 May 1959. His father died when he was 20.

He studied veterinary medicine at the École nationale vétérinaire d'Alfort at Maisons-Alfort in Paris. He later obtained an MBA at HEC Paris.

Career

Roussel Uclaf
In April 1986, he joined Roussel Uclaf (formerly France's second largest pharmaceutical company, until bought by Hoechst AG in 1997) as a salesman in Australia. In 1996, he became General Manager of Hoechst Marion Roussel in Australia, moving to Tokyo in April 1997.

Aventis
In 2000 he moved to Aventis in America, becoming chief operating officer of Aventis USA in 2002, which became Sanofi Aventis USA in 2004.

Roche
He joined Roche in 2006. From April 2009 to 2010, he was chief executive of the Roche subsidiary Genentech. He rejoined Roche Pharma AG in 2010 as chief operating officer.

AstraZeneca
In August 2012 he was named as the new chief executive of AstraZeneca, the world's fifth largest pharmaceutical company, when aged 53. He took up the post on 1 October 2012.

In July 2017, it was reported that Soriot would become the next CEO of Israel-based Teva Pharmaceutical Industries, succeeding Erez Vigodman, though this was soon denied.

In September 2018, he made headlines commenting on his pay of £9.4m in salary and bonuses. 'The truth is I’m the lowest-paid CEO in the whole industry', he said. 'It is annoying to some extent. But at the end of the day it is what it is.'

Personal life
He is married and has two children. He has three brothers, all of whom are doctors.

Soriot was knighted in the 2022 Birthday Honours for services to UK life sciences and the response to COVID-19. He qualifies for a substantive knighthood rather than an honorary one by virtue of being an Australian citizen.

References

External links
 Roche

1959 births
Living people
AstraZeneca people
HEC Paris alumni
Chief operating officers
Chief executives in the pharmaceutical industry
French chief executives
French veterinarians
Genentech people
Hoffmann-La Roche people
Sanofi people
French expatriates in Australia
Australian Knights Bachelor